Rabbi Younes Hamami Lalehzar (Persian: یونس حمامی لاله‌زار) is the current religious leader of Iranian Jews.

Earlier life 
Younes Hamami was born in 1965 in Yazd, Iran in a religious Jewish family. His father, Musa Hamami was one of the prominent merchants of Yazd. He studied at Alliance Israelite Universelle school in Yazd and Tehran. In 1986 he entered Shahid Beheshti University to study Medicine and he finished his medical degree in 1993. In 2001 he obtained his internal medicine board from the same school. 

He has been working as an internal physician in Tehran's Dr. Sapir Hospital and Charity Center since 2001. 

During the same time, he studied Jewish religious law under the supervision of famous Iranian Rabbis such as Musa Rabbani, Zion Hakakian, Musa Tajian, and Levi Hayyim. He further studied Torah and Talmud under chief Rabbi Uriel Davidi and Rabbi Baal Nes in Shiraz.

He has been the spokesperson for the Beth din of Tehran Jewish Committee. He further helped create official religious books for Jewish students in high school. He has been teaching in Yeshiva of Abrishami Synagogue since 1996.

Personal life 
Younes Hamami is married to Helen Moghaddam, they have two daughters and a son.

See also 
 Tehran Jewish Committee
 Abrishami Synagogue

References 

Iranian Jews
Mizrahi Jews
Iranian religious leaders
People from Yazd
20th-century Iranian people
21st-century Iranian people